The Madonna and Child with Six Saints, also known as Sant'Ambrogio Altarpiece, is a painting by the Italian Renaissance master Sandro Botticelli, finished around 1470. It is housed in the Galleria degli Uffizi, in Florence.

It portrays the Virgin enthroned with the saints Mary Magdalene, John the Baptist, Francis of Assisi, Catherine of Alexandria and, kneeling, Cosmas and Damian (patrons of the House of Medici). It is in fact most likely that the latter are portraits of Medici members. Lorenzo il Magnifico and his brother Giuliano have been considered.

References

External links
Page at artonline.it  

1470s paintings
Paintings by Sandro Botticelli in the Uffizi
Paintings of the Madonna and Child by Sandro Botticelli
Paintings depicting John the Baptist
Paintings depicting Mary Magdalene
Paintings of Francis of Assisi
Paintings of Saints Cosmas and Damian
Paintings of Catherine of Alexandria